10 to 11 is a 2009 Turkish drama film directed by Pelin Esmer.

The film, loosely based on the story of Esmer’s uncle, Mithat Esmer, who also plays the leading role, follows an elderly collector in İstanbul who lives in a rundown apartment building that is under threat of demolition.

Release

General release 

Festival screenings
 28th Istanbul International Film Festival (April 4–19, 2009)
 17th Altın Koza International Film Festival
 3rd International Middle East Film Festival (October 9–17, 2009)
 20th Tromso International Film Festival (January 19–24, 2010)
 39th International Film Festival Rotterdam (January 27-February 7, 2010)
 Travelling Rennes Film Festival (February 9–16, 2010)
 15th Nuremberg Turkish-German Film Festival
 21st Ankara International Film Festival (March 11–21, 2010)
 Cinema Novo Film Festival (March 11–21, 2010)
 Crossing Europe Film Festival (April 20–25, 2010)
 IndieLisboa Film Festival (April 22-May 2, 2010)

Reception

Box office
The film debuted number eleven in the Turkish box office chart and has made a total gross of $69,913.

Awards
 28th Istanbul International Film Festival (4-19 Apr, 2009)
 Special Jury Prize - National Competition  (Won)
 17th Altın Koza International Film Festival
 Golden Boll Award for Best Film: Pelin Esmer   (Won)
 Golden Boll Award for Best Screenplay: Pelin Esmer  (Won)
 3rd International Middle East Film Festival (9-17 Oct, 2009)
 Black Pearl Award for Best New Middle Eastern Narrative Director Award: Pelin Esmer (Won)
 20th Tromso International Film Festival (19-24 Jan, 2010)
 FIPRESCI Award (Won)
 15th Nuremberg Turkish-German Film Festival
 Best Film Award (Won)
 Cinema Critics Award (Won)
 21st Ankara International Film Festival (11–21 March 2010)
 Best Director Award: Pelin Esmer (Won)
 Best Screenplay Award: Pelin Esmer (Won)

See also
 2009 in film
 Turkish films of 2009

References

External links
  for the film
 
 Film page on Filmpot

2009 films
Turkish drama films
Films set in Turkey
Best Picture Golden Boll Award winners
2000s Turkish-language films
2009 drama films